Košarkaški klub Borac Zemun, commonly referred to as KK Borac Zemun, is a men's basketball club based in Zemun, near Belgrade, Serbia. They are currently competing in the Second Basketball League of Serbia.

History 
The club was found in April 2009 as a farm team of Mladost Zemun under the name ZKK Mladost 2009 (Zemunski košarkaški klub Mladost 2009). In 2014, the club was disaffiliated from Mladost and changed its name to KK Borac Zemun. The club used to play in the 3rd-tier First Regional League of Serbia, Center Division.

In September 2020, they got a wild card and promotion to the Second Basketball League of Serbia for the 2020–21 season following withdrawal of Zemun. In January 2022, the club won the 2nd-tier Cup of Serbia, after a 86–79 win over Radnički Kragujevac in the final. It qualified them for the 2022 Radivoj Korać Cup.

Home arena

Borac Zemun plays its home games at the Pinki Hall. The hall is located in the Zemun Municipality in Belgrade and was built in 1974, and renovated in 2015. It has a seating capacity of 5,000 seats.

Players 

 Stefan Balmazović
 Igor Mijajlović

Head coaches 

  Vedran Popović (2019–2021)
  Siniša Matić (2021–2022)
  Pavle Trifunović (2022)
  Marko Boras (2022–present)

Trophies and awards

Trophies
League Cup of Serbia (2nd-tier)
Winner (1): 2021–22

See also 
 KK Mladost Zemun
 KK Zemun

References

External links
 Profile at srbijasport.net 
 Profile at eurobasket.com
 Profile at Belgrade Basketball Association

Borac
Borac
Basketball teams in Belgrade
Sport in Zemun